The early phase of the Battle of the Atlantic during which German Navy U-boats enjoyed significant success against the British Royal Navy and its Allies was referred to by U-boat crews as "the Happy Time" ("Die Glückliche Zeit"), and later the First Happy Time, after a second successful period was encountered.

It started in July 1940, almost immediately after the Fall of France, which brought the German U-boat fleet closer to the British shipping lanes in the Atlantic. From July 1940 to the end of October, 282 Allied ships were sunk off the north-west approaches to Ireland for a loss of 1,489,795 tons of merchant shipping.

The reason for this successful Axis period was the British lack of radar and huff-duff equipped ships which meant that the U-boats were very hard to detect when they made nighttime surface attacks – ASDIC (sonar) could only detect submerged U-boats. 

When it ended is a matter of interpretation, with some sources claiming October 1940 and others extending it to April 1941, after the Germans lost three prominent U-boat commanders: Günther Prien, Joachim Schepke and Otto Kretschmer.

See also
 Operation Berlin
 Convoy SC 7
 Convoy HX 84
 Convoy HX 106
 Convoy HX 112
 Convoy OB 293
 Second Happy Time

References

Battle of the Atlantic